VR Class Sr3 is the newest electric locomotive series used by VR Group. It is based on Vectron model, manufactured by Siemens Mobility. Sr3s are used with both passenger and freight trains and they will replace the old Sr1 electric locomotives.

See also
VR Class Sr1
VR Class Sr2

References
VR Group: Vectron locomotives for Finland (railcolor.net)

External links
 

Electric locomotives of Finland
VR locomotives
5 ft gauge locomotives
Siemens locomotives